The Missouri Lifestyle Journalism Awards were first awarded in 1960 as the Penney-Missouri Awards to recognize women's pages that covered topics other than society, club, and fashion news, and that also covered such topics as lifestyle and consumer affairs. The Penney-Missouri Awards were often described as the "Pulitzer Prize of feature writing". They were the only nationwide recognition specifically for women's page journalists, at a time when few women had other opportunities to write or edit for newspapers.  The annual awards appear to have been last given in 2008.

History
The Penney-Missouri awards were conceived by James Cash Penney, founder of the J. C. Penney retail chain, who hoped improving women's page sections would turn them into more effective advertising channels for his stores. Penney established the award at the University of Missouri because he believed the school had the necessary prestige.

Kimberly Wilmot Voss's research suggests that as early as 1960, when the awards were established, women's page sections were reporting on a broader range of issues than expected, often creating the kind of coverage the awards were intended to encourage: "more than just society notices and photographs of brides".

In 1974, as most newspapers were changing their women's sections into features sections, contest rules changed to allow entries from journalists who did not work full-time in a women's page section.

In 1994, J. C. Penney stopped funding the awards, and they were renamed as the Missouri Lifestyle Journalism Awards, with the University of Missouri funding as well as judging.

Award winners were announced for 2008 and previous years in the media and Missouri School of Journalism press releases.  However, at least some of the trophies and $1,000 cash prizes for the 2008 winners were only distributed after public reporting of what journalism reporter Jim Romenesko described as "the no-prizes flap," and as late as May 2009, nine months after the announcement of winners.  There appears to be no evidence of the awards being given after 2008.

Leadership
The directors of the award program were:
Paul L. Myhre (1960–1971)
Robert Hosakawa (1971–1976)
Ruth D'Arcy (1976–1984)
George Pica (1984–1988); Pica was also a previous winner of the award
Nancy Beth Jackson (1988–1994)
Kent Collins (in 2009)

Impact
Rodger Streitmatter, writing in the scholarly journal Journalism History, credits the awards for helping to change women's pages journalism.

Award winners 
 
 Marie Anderson
 The Ann Arbor News
 Pete Axthelm
 Bill Reiter
 Joel Brinkley
 Jane Brody
 Marian Burros
 Benedict Carey
 Vivian Castleberry
 Daily Camera
 Dallas Times Herald
 The Detroit News
 Lynne Duke
 East Bay Express
 David Finkel
 Fort Worth Star-Telegram
 Mary Nogueras Frampton
 The Greenville News
 Paul Hendrickson
 Marj Heyduck
 Sarah Kaufman (critic)
 Kettering-Oakwood Times
 John Mecklin (journalist)
 The Mercury News
 Milwaukee Journal Sentinel
 The Montana Standard
 The New York Times
 Russ Parsons
 Marjorie Paxson
 John Pekkanen
 The Phoenix (newspaper)
 The Plain Dealer
 Portland Press Herald
 Quad-City Times
 Susan Quinn
 Raul Ramirez (journalist)
 Phyllis Richman
 Peter Rinearson
 The Roanoke Times
 Joseph Rosendo
 San Jose Mercury News West Magazine
 Gail Sheehy
 Mimi Sheraton
 C. W. Smith (writer)
 Gloria Steinem
 Carol Sutton (journalist)
 The Washington Post
 Gene Weingarten
 WomenSports

References

 
University of Missouri